A sabbatical  (from the Hebrew:   (i.e., Sabbath); in Latin ;) is a rest or break from work.

The concept of the sabbatical is based on the Biblical practice of shmita (sabbatical year), which is related to agriculture. Starting with Harvard University in 1880, many universities and other institutional employers of scientists, physicians, and academics offer the opportunity to qualify for paid sabbatical as an employee benefit, called sabbatical leave. Early academic sabbatical policies were designed to aid their faculty in resting and recovering, but were also provided in order to facilitate "advancements in knowledge in vogue elsewhere...an intellectual and practical necessity" for both the professors and university education more broadly. Present day academic sabbaticals typically excuse the grantee from day to day teaching and departmental duties, though progress on research is expected to continue, if not increase, while away. Academic sabbaticals come in the form of either semester-long or full-academic year terms.  

A sabbatical has also come to mean a lengthy, intentional break from a career. The popularity of sabbaticals for non-academics has increased in the 21st century: 17% of companies offered some sort of sabbatical policy to their employees in 2017, according to a survey by the Society For Human Resource Management. There are very few norms and expectations for non-academic, or professional, sabbaticals. They can be paid or unpaid, affiliated with one's employer or self-directed, and have a variety of durations, from several weeks to over a year.

See also
 Sabbatical officer
 Career break
 Gap year
 Long service leave
 Otium

References

Further reading
 
 
 https://time.com/charter/6120287/sabbaticals-time-off-great-resignation/
 https://www.wsj.com/articles/the-sabbatical-a-power-move-for-the-burnout-era-11641358862
 https://www.fastcompany.com/90715900/great-resignation-sabbatical-gap-year
 https://www.theatlantic.com/family/archive/2022/05/us-sabbatical-helps-work-burnout/629956/
 www.thesabbaticalproject.org
 https://hbr.org/2017/08/research-shows-that-organizations-benefit-when-employees-take-sabbaticals
 https://www.shrm.org/hr-today/trends-and-forecasting/research-and-surveys/Documents/2017%20Employee%20Benefits%20Report.pdf

External links
 

Academic culture
Sabbath
Hebrew words and phrases